Morteza Hemmasian (born 1942) is an Iranian chess player, Iranian Chess Championship winner (1963).

Biography
In the begin of 1960s Morteza Hemmasian was one of the leading Iranian chess players. In 1963 he won Iranian Chess Championship. In 1969, in Singapore Morteza Hemmasian participated in FIDE World Chess Championship West Asian Zonal tournament and ranked in 8th place.

Morteza Hemmasian played for Iran in the Chess Olympiad:
 In 1962, at first board in the 15th Chess Olympiad in Varna (+5, =5, -9).

References

External links

1942 births
Living people
Iranian chess players
Chess Olympiad competitors
20th-century chess players